Season 3 of Austria's Next Topmodel aired on Puls 4 from January to March 2011. The judging panel consisted of Lena Gercke, Elvyra Geyer, and Atil Kutoglu. Among the prizes were a cover on Austrian magazine Woman, the face of the newest Hervis campaign as well as two runway jobs at the Milan and Paris Fashion Week.

The first episode featured contestants in all nine Austrian federal states and the top four from each state automatically qualified for a spot in the first episode. The top four competed again with the favorite of each state making the final cast directly. Five more contestants were granted wildcard spots, making a total of 14 competing in the remaining episodes. Another change was that there was one casting to book in every episode where the actual job would take place abroad, however only the winner would be allowed to travel there. The only international destination to where all cast members traveled was New York City.

Episodes

Episode 1 
Original airdate: 

Episode 1 was the casting episode.

Episode 2 
Original airdate: 
Quit: Lisa Berghold
Challenge winner: Lydia Obute
Booked for job/Immune: Vanessa Lotz
Eliminated: Victoria Vogeler

Episode 3 
Original airdate: 
Challenge winner: Darija Gavric
Booked for job: Lydia Obute & Vanessa Lotz
Bottom two: Sarah Preiml & Valerie Heidenreich
Eliminated: Sarah Preiml

Episode 4 
Original airdate: 
Challenge winner: Julia Trummer 
Booked for job: Lydia Obute & Magalie Berghahn
Disqualified: Magalie Berghahn
Bottom three: Linda Linortner, Nadine Oberleiter & Nicole Gerzabek
Eliminated: See below

Episode 5 
Original airdate: 
Eliminated (episode 4): Nadine Oberleiter 
Challenge winner: Lydia Obute   
Booked for job: Darija Gavric & Katharina Theuermann 
Bottom two: Linda Linortner & Valerie Heidenreich
Eliminated: Linda Linortner

Episode 6 
Original airdate: 
Booked for job: Darija Gavric, Lydia Obute,  Romana Gruber & Vanessa Lotz
Challenge winner: Nicole Gerzabek 
Eliminated: Valerie Heidenreich & Vanessa Lotz

Episode 7 
Original airdate: 
Bottom two: Julia Trummer & Romana Gruber
Eliminated: None

Episode 8 
Original airdate: 
Bottom three: Darija Gavric, Julia Trummer & Nicole Gerzabek
Eliminated: Nicole Gerzabek

Episode 9 
Original airdate: 
Eliminated: Julia Trummer 
Bottom two: Katharina Theuermann & Romana Gruber
Eliminated: None

Episode 10 
Original airdate: 
Final four: Darija Gavric, Katharina Theuermann, Lydia Obute & Romana Gruber
Eliminated: Darija Gavric
Final three: Katharina Theuermann, Lydia Obute & Romana Gruber
Eliminated: Romana Gruber
Final two: Katharina Theuermann & Lydia Obute 
Austria's next topmodel: Lydia Obute

Contestants
(ages stated are at start of contest)

Summaries

 
 The contestant quit the competition  
 The contestant was disqualified from the competition
 The contestant was immune from elimination
 The contestant was in danger of elimination
 The contestant was eliminated
 The contestant won the competition

Photo shoot guide
 Episode 2 photo shoot: Posing nude with two Philipp Plein accesoires
 Episode 3 photo shoot: Pointless action 
 Episode 4 photo shoot: Champagne all over
 Episode 5 photo shoot: Jewel thieves 
 Episode 6 photo shoot: Fierce sluts
 Episode 7 photo shoot: Being Romy Schneider 
 Episode 8 photo shoot: Going editorial with falcons
 Episode 9 photo shoot: Woman magazine covers 
 Episode 10 photo shoot: Flaming ice

Judges
Lena Gercke (Host)
Elvyra Geyer
Atil Kotuglu

Magalie's racism controversy
In the fourth episode, contestant Magalie Berghahn was disqualified in the show for racist comments she made during a phone conversation with her boyfriend. She referred to fellow competitor Lydia Obute as "Neger Oide" (negative afflicted Austrian slang for Black Woman) and to Vanessa Lotz as "Deitsche" (slang for German Woman). Both Obute and Lotz won a go-see that episode. The conversation was fully taped and aired during the show. She was confronted by host Lena Gercke with the video material in front of the other two girls. Gercke then told her that she was expelled from the show given the competition has no room for racist ideas and thoughts. As a result, Berghahn was not invited to the final runway show of the cast on the seasons final, and she later stated that the scandal ruined her life.

Puls 4 was later accused of using the controversy for promotional purposes as Berghahn's comments were already shown in the preview for the episode and uncensored during the airing of Episode 4.

References

External links
 Official website

Austria's Next Topmodel
2010s Austrian television series
2011 Austrian television seasons
German-language television shows
Television shows filmed in Austria
Television shows filmed in New York City

de:Austria’s Next Topmodel